Tafelspitz (German Tafelspitz, top of the table) is boiled veal or beef in broth, served with a mix of minced apples and horseradish. It is a classic dish of the Viennese cuisine and popular in all of Austria and the neighboring German state of Bavaria.

Franz Joseph I, Emperor of Austria, was a great lover of Tafelspitz. According to the 1912 official cookery textbook used in domestic science schools of the Austro-Hungarian Empire, "His Majesty's private table is never without a fine piece of boiled beef, which is one of his favorite dishes."

The dish 
Tafelspitz is simmered along with root vegetables and spices in the broth. It is usually served with roasted slices of potato and a mix of minced apples and horseradish or sour cream mixed with chives.

The cut

Tafelspitz is the Austrian name of the meat cut which is used, usually from a young ox. This cut is typically known in the United States as the Standing Rump or Top Round, depending on the nomenclature of cuts used. The British cut would be called Topside. In Australia, it is called the Rump Cap. It is the top hind end of the cattle where the tail originates. Alternatively, a similar cut of beef from a young ox, properly hung, with firm white fat (not yellow). The fat can be left on to prevent the meat from becoming dry.

Austrian butchers gave almost every muscle of beef a separate name.  The hind leg alone is parted into 16 cuts: there is for example the Hüferscherzl, Hüferschwanzl, Nuss, Wadlstutzen, Gschnatter, Schwarzes Scherzl, Weißes Scherzl, Dünnes Kügerl, Schalblattel (also called Fledermaus).

See also 
 Boiled beef, a traditional English working-class dish
 Pot-au-feu, a traditional French dish

References

External links 

 Classic recipe

Austrian cuisine
Bavarian cuisine
German beef dishes